Abang may refer to:

Geography
Rantau Abang (Abang region), small village located in Terengganu, Malaysia
Tanah Abang (Abang land), subdistrict of Central Jakarta, Indonesia
Gunung Abang (Mount Abang), a mountain part of the caldera of Mount Batur on Bali, Indonesia

Surname
Anatole Abang (born 1996), Cameroonian footballer
Antoine Abang (born 1941), Cameroonian boxer
Avelina Abang (born 2003), Equatorial Guinean footballer
Mercy Abang, journalist from Nigeria

Given name
Abang (orangutan)
Abang Haji Abdillah (1862–1946), Malaysian politician in Sarawak
Abang Abu Bakar, former Member of Parliament for Asajaya, Sarawak
Abang Iskandar Abang Hashim (born 1959), Malaysian lawyer, the sixth Chief Judge of Sabah and Sarawak
Dayang Noor Camelia Abang Khalid (born 1974), Malaysian singer and model
Abang Abdul Rahman Johari Abang Openg (born 1950), Malaysian politician, Premier of Sarawak
Abang Openg (1905–1969), Malaysian politician, the first Yang di-Pertua Negeri of Sarawak
Abang Muhammad Salahuddin (1921–2022), Malaysian politician, the third Yang di-Pertua Negeri of Sarawak
Abang Norsillmy Taha (born 1978), retired Bruneian footballer

See also
Abaiang
Abanga (disambiguation)
Abangan
Abhang
Avang, a traditional trading ship of the Ivatan people of the Philippines
Babang (disambiguation)